Now That's What I Call Music! 57 or Now 57 may refer to:

Now That's What I Call Music! 57 (UK series)
Now That's What I Call Music! 57 (U.S. series)